A cognitive vulnerability in cognitive psychology is an erroneous belief, cognitive bias, or pattern of thought that predisposes an individual to psychological problems.  The vulnerability exists before the symptoms of a psychological disorder appear. After the individual encounters a stressful experience, the cognitive vulnerability shapes a maladaptive response that increases the likelihood of a psychological disorder.

In psychopathology, there are several perspectives from which the origins of cognitive vulnerabilities can be examined,
It is the path way of including cognitive schema models, hopelessness models, and attachment theory. Attentional bias is one mechanism leading to faulty cognitive bias that leads to cognitive vulnerability.  Allocating a danger level to a threat depends on the urgency or intensity of the threshold.  Anxiety is not associated with selective orientation.

Theories

Cognitive theory
Preliminary or "distal" causes contribute to the formation of a cognitive vulnerability that ultimately, via immediate or proximal causes, leads to the individual manifesting symptoms of the disorder.  Immediate cognitive and emotional responses trigger imagery and assumptions formed in the past leading to offsetting, defensive behavior and in turn reinforcing mistaken beliefs or other cognitive vulnerabilities.

Attachment theory
The contact made with caretakers determines a certain attachment process.  When secure attachment is disrupted and starts to become insecure, abnormal patterns begin, increasing risk for depression.  Working models build perceptions of relationships with others.  Cognitive vulnerability is created with maladaptive cognitive processing when building relationships and attachments.

The diathesis-stress relationship
Diathesis contributes to vulnerability. The diathesis refers to the inclination to illness. In the diathesis-stress relationship, hidden vulnerability is activated through events that the individual perceives as stressful. Vulnerability in psychological terms is implied as an increased probability of emotional pain and some type of psychopathology.  Vulnerability can be a combination and interaction of genetic or acquired experiences.  Vulnerability leads to putting up with something unpleasant and represents symptoms of various psychological disorders. Vulnerability predisposes individuals to a disorder, but does not initiate the disorder.  Depending on the individual's subjective perception of an event, the diathesis leads to a certain psychological illness.

Psychological problems

Depression

Through several cognitive biases, selective mood-congruent cues become established over long intervals.  Emotional stimuli matching the emotional concerns create an aggregate effect on symptoms related to depression. Depression is associated with selective orientation. It prevents attention toward emotional cues that do not fit the internalized scheme to which the individual has become vulnerable, and leads to comorbid anxiety. When individuals who are prone to depression are asked to recall a specific event, they explain the general class of events (e.g., "The time when I was living with my parents").

Dual process model
Associative and reflective processing mechanisms apply when cognitive vulnerability is processed into depression. The dual process model is valid in social and personality psychology but is not adapted to clinical phenomena.  Negative bias in self-assessment provides a foundation for a cognitive vulnerability to depression.  Then a downward spiral forms to create forms of dysphoria.  Negatively biased associative processing will maintain a dysphoric mood state. As the dysphoric mood escalates, cognitive resources necessary to combating dysphoria by reflective processing are depleted. Irrelevant tasks and intrusive thoughts come to mind when in a dysphoric mood, and cognitive resource depletion further contributes to mood escalation.

Feedback loop
The feedback loop in the dual process model is between self referent cognition and dysphoria. The feedback loop establishes an inability to apply reflective processing to correct negative biases.

Mood persistence 
Postponing the reflective processes leads to mood persistence. The individual becomes accustomed to a state of dysphoria as they experience more and more negative mood states. Dysphoric moods create more associative processing for depressive vulnerable people by negative cognitive biases.  When associative bias gets stronger, the bias becomes difficult to override. Ineffective reflective strategies lead to persistence of dysphoric moods.

A depressive episode as a vulnerability factor for depression
The likelihood of another depressive episode escalates with the number of previous episodes.  A depressive episode by itself is a vulnerability factor.  Each episode of depression makes it easier for the neurotransmitter system to become deregulated.  A strong stressor is needed for the initializing first episode; however, subsequent episodes can be triggered by increasingly mild stressors. Contextual information develops such that small changes in mood are sufficient to activate vulnerability.  Weakening and frequency of depressive episodes triggers the biological processes related to the initial episode. Depressive episodes are experienced as having no control over traumatic events. A depressive condition results in social rejection and lowered self esteem, leading to further depressive symptoms.

Schema models
Schemas in depression are formed in association with stressful events in childhood and condition the individual to respond in an abnormal manner to life experiences that recall those childhood traumas.  During childhood and adolescence, the individual who is prone to depression begins to match life situations with prototypes of specific stressful experiences from childhood. The cognitive vulnerability thus manifests itself.

Learned helplessness

Negative events during childhood lead the child to internalize negative events. Just as repeated positive experiences lead the child to develop a positive self image and optimism regarding future events, negative events lead to the development of expectations of hopelessness or even depression when the individual faces a stressful situation in the future.

Bipolar disorder
A study of people with bipolar disorder found that, compared with non-bipolar controls, they had significantly higher levels of dysfunctional attitudes such as perfectionism and need for approval that increase their cognitive vulnerability to depression.

See also
 Animal cognition
 Cognitive behavioral therapy (CBT)
 Cognitive bias
 Cognitive bias mitigation
 Cognitive bias modification
 Cognitive dissonance
 Cognitive distortion
 Cognitive linguistics
 Cognitive module
 Cognitive space
 Cognitive style
 Cognitive therapy (CT)
 Comparative cognition
 Debiasing

References

Vulnerability
Cognitive psychology
Cognitive disorders